Antena: Camino Del Sol is the second compilation album by The Numero Group (NUM002), based on a mini-album originally released in September 1982. It features tracks by French-Belgian trio Antena who were then signed to Belgian label Les Disques Du Crepuscule. Antena featured Isabelle Antena, a pseudonym for Isabelle Powaga, who is a cult figure known for her song "Say I Believe In It." The re-release contains re-mastered tracks, B-sides and two previously unreleased songs.

Track listing 
 Camino Del Sol
 To Climb the Cliff
 Silly Things
 Sissexa
 Achilles
 Bye Bye Papaye
 Noelle a Hawaii
 Les Demoiselles De Rochefort
 Spiral Staircase
 Unable
 The Boy from Ipanema
 Seaside Weekend
 Frantz
 Ingenuous

References

External links 
 Numero Group
 Antena Stories - blog

1982 compilation albums
The Numero Group compilation albums